Albert Latham may refer to:
 Albert George Latham, professor of modern languages
 Albert Latham (footballer), English footballer